Irek Minzakievich Murtazin (: ; born 5 April 1964, Bogatye Saby, Sabinskii region, Tatar ASSR) is a journalist and blogger, specialist of the International Institute of Research in Policy and the Humanities in Moscow  and, since September 2008, publisher of the newspaper Kazan News. Murtazin previously served as director of the Minsk bureau of the Russian state television station "Russia" (2003–2004), director of the state television station "Tatarstan" (2002–2003), and press secretary of the president of the Republic of Tatarstan, Mintimer Shaimiev (1999–2002).

In September 2008, he posted information to his blog to the effect that Tatar president Shaimiev had died; this information proved to be false. As a result, he was the subject of a criminal investigation into the matter. On 26 November 2009, Murtazin was found guilty of libel and "instigating hatred and hostility" to an ethnic or social group and sentenced to 1 year, 9 months of hard labor. Murtazin had previously clashed with local and federal elites in his journalistic work; he resigned his post at "Tatarstan" on 14 November 2003 in the wake of a controversial segment in which program participants criticized Tatar policies and the war in Chechnya. In December 2008, he was attacked and beaten near his Kazan apartment by unidentified persons.

Works 
In addition to his work as a newspaper and television journalist, Murtazin has published several monographs.
 The Last Romantic
 The Death of a Television Magnate
 The Island of Tatarstan
 Mintimer Shaimiev: Last President of Tatarstan (Cheboksary, 2007)

External links 
 Murtazin's LiveJournal, where the information on Shaimiev's alleged death was first posted, and which is now being used to support Murtazin during his imprisonment.

References 

Tatar people of Russia
Russian journalists
1964 births
Living people
Novaya Gazeta